State of Discontent is the fifth official album by the punk rock band The Unseen and their first on Hellcat Records, a subsidiary label of Epitaph Records. It was released on May 9, 2005, internationally and a day later in the United States. It was produced by Brett Gurewitz of Bad Religion and Ken Casey of the Dropkick Murphys. The album included guest appearances by Lars Frederiksen of Rancid and Dicky Barrett of the Mighty Mighty Bosstones. The final track is a cover version of "Paint It, Black" by The Rolling Stones.

Track listing
 "On the Other Side" (lyrics: Mark music: Scott)             2:34
 "Scream Out" (lyrics: Mark music: Scott)                    2:51
 "The End Is Near" (lyrics: Mark music: Scott)               1:26
 "Weapons of Mass Deception" (lyrics: Tripp music: Tripp & Mike "Rufio" Kadomiya)     2:15
 "You Can Never Go Home" (lyrics & music: Tripp)         2:30
 "Dead Weight Falls" (lyrics: Mark music: Ian Galloway)             2:50
 "Force Fed" (lyrics: Mark music: Scott & Tripp)                     2:10
 "Social Damage" (lyrics: Mark music: Scott)                  2:13
 "Waste of Time" (lyrics: Mark music: Scott)                  3:07
 "Hit and Run" (lyrics: Mark music: Mike "Rufio" Kadomiya)                   2:10
 "We Are All That We Have" (lyrics & music: Tripp)       1:41
 "Flames Have Destroyed" (lyrics: Mark music: Scott)         1:04
 "Final Execution (Armageddon)" (lyrics: Mark music: Mike "Rufio" Kadomiya)  2:34
 "Paint It, Black" (Rolling Stones cover)            2:34

Personnel
 Mark - Vocals
 Scott - Lead Guitar
 Tripp - Bass, Vocals
 Pat Melzard - Drums
 Mike "Rufio" Kadomiya - Rhythm Guitar (on tracks 4, 10, & 13), Backing Vocals
 Ian Galloway - Rhythm Guitar (on track 6), Backing Vocals
 Laura Casey - Cello, Viola (on track 1)
 Bill Brown - Backing Vocals
 James Lynch - Backing Vocals
 Ken Casey - Backing Vocals
 Lars Frederiksen - Backing Vocals (on track 11)
 Matt Kelly - Backing Vocals
 Dicky Barrett - Backing Vocals (on track 14)

References

External links
State Of Discontent @ discogs.com

The Unseen (band) albums
2005 albums
Hellcat Records albums